Uncharacterized LOC100287225 is a protein that in humans is encoded by the RP11-267C16.1 gene.

References

Further reading 

Genes
Human proteins